G Album: 24/7 is the seventh studio album of the Japanese duo KinKi Kids. It was released on October 22, 2003 and debuted at the top of the Oricon charts, selling 242,826 copies in its first week. The album was certified platinum by the RIAJ for 250,000 copies shipped to stores in Japan.

Track listing

References

 G Album: 24/7. Johnny's net. Retrieved October 31, 2009.

External links
 Official KinKi Kids website

2003 albums
KinKi Kids albums